Daphne Barak-Erez (born 2 January 1965) is an Israeli law professor. Since May 2012, she serves as a judge in the Supreme Court of Israel.

Personal life
Daphne Barak-Erez was born in the United States to Israeli parents, and became a citizen by birthright of the United States. The family later returned to Israel, where she was raised. She studied law at Tel Aviv University as part of the Atuda program, earning LLB, LLM, and PhD degrees, and did postdoctoral research at Harvard University. She served in the Military Advocate General's Office of the Israel Defense Forces, and was discharged from regular service with the rank of captain. She continued serving in the reserves and reached the rank of Lieutenant Colonel.

In 2012, she renounced her US citizenship as required by Israeli law in order to take up her Supreme Court position.

Legal and academic career
Barak-Erez was appointed a lecturer at the University of Haifa Faculty of Law in 1991, and at the Tel Aviv University Faculty of Law in 1992. She was appointed associate professor, and became a full professor in 2004. She was also a lecturer at IDC Herzliya and the College of Management. She was appointed Dean of the Faculty of Law at Tel Aviv University in the fall of 2011. As a scholar, she specializes in constitutional and administrative law. In 2009 she was one of the final candidates for the position of Attorney General. Barak-Erez was a visiting professor at various universities, including Columbia, Stanford, Duke, and UCLA, as well as a visiting researcher in other distinguished institutions such as Harvard, Yale, Cambridge, and the Max Planck Institute.

Publications
Barak-Erez is the author and editor of 20 books and 130 articles, including Outlawed Pigs: Law, Religion and Culture in Israel (University of Wisconsin Press, 2007) and Administrative Law (in Hebrew, 4 volumes, 2010, 2013, 2017). She is currently a member of Council for Higher Education in Israel.

Awards and recognition
She was awarded several prizes, including the Zeltner Prize, the Rector's Prize for Excellence in Teaching (twice), the Woman of the City Award by the City of Tel Aviv, and the Women in Law Award by the Israel Bar Association.

In November 2013, Daphne Barak-Erez accepted an award in Israel's name, for progress made in reducing gender gaps. The award was presented by Women in Parliament Global Forum during a ceremony at the European Parliament in Brussels.

See also
 Israeli judicial system

References

1965 births
Living people
Israeli legal scholars
People who renounced United States citizenship
Tel Aviv University alumni
Academic staff of Tel Aviv University
Judges of the Supreme Court of Israel
Israeli women judges
Women legal scholars
Scholars of administrative law
Scholars of constitutional law
21st-century Israeli women writers
American emigrants to Israel